The 120 members of the fourteenth Knesset were elected on 29 May 1996. The breakdown by party was as follows:

Labor Party: 34
Likud-Gesher-Tzomet: 32
Shas: 10
National Religious Party: 9
Meretz: 9
Yisrael BaAliyah: 7
Hadash-Balad: 5
United Torah Judaism: 4
The Third Way: 4
Arab Democratic Party-United Arab List (Mada-Ra'am): 4
Moledet: 2

List of members

Replacements

External links
Knesset members in the Fourteenth Knesset Knesset website

 
14